Hiroshia is a genus of moths belonging to the subfamily Thyatirinae of the Drepanidae.

Species
 Hiroshia albinigra László, G.Ronkay & L.Ronkay, 2001
 Hiroshia nanlingana H.L. Zhuang, M. Owada & M. Wang, 2014

References

Thyatirinae
Drepanidae genera